Lauga may refer to:

People
 Brittany Lauga (born 1986), Australian politician
 Burman Lauga, Australian politician
 , French politician
 , French rugby player
 , French rugby player

Places
 Lauga, Barinque, France
 Lauga, Estonia
 Lauga, Valli del Pasubio, Italy